KTFL, VHF analog channel 4 (UHF digital channel 18), was a FamilyNet-affiliated television station licensed to  Flagstaff, Arizona, United States. The station was owned by WTVA, Inc. (the Spain family). The station signed off June 1, 2006, with its broadcasting license cancelled by the FCC.

External links 
 More license info from the FCC

TFL
Defunct television stations in the United States
Television channels and stations established in 2000
Television channels and stations disestablished in 2006
2000 establishments in Arizona
2006 disestablishments in Arizona
TFL